Australia's Most Wanted is a television program based on the format made popular by America's Most Wanted. It screened on the Seven Network from 1989 until 1999.

The show was often in the headlines due to its graphic crime scene re-enactments which many deemed too distressing for the show's 7:30pm Monday timeslot.

After the Seven Network cancelled the series, the Nine Network created their own version of the format. It was unsuccessful and cancelled after six weeks.

Presenters
Featured presenters on the various incarnations of the show included:
 Bryan Marshall - 1989
 Ann Sanders - 1993
 Sarah Henderson - 1994
 Roger Climpson - 1997-99 
 Alastair Duncan - Voiceover (Seven Network)
 Hugh Riminton - Host (Nine Network)

During 1993, the regular New South Wales Police representative was Senior Constable Denise Behringer.

Wanted 
In 2013, Channel Ten Australia re-booted the series calling it WANTED. The hosts were Sandra Sully and Matt Doran. The show was not a success and was cancelled two months later.

References

Australian television news shows
1990s Australian reality television series
Australian factual television series
Seven Network original programming
Nine Network original programming
1989 Australian television series debuts
1999 Australian television series endings
Television series by Reg Grundy Productions